Abdullah Şahindere (born 9 June 2003) is a Turkish footballer who plays as a defender for Gençlerbirliği.

Career statistics

Club

Notes

References

2003 births
Living people
Turkish footballers
Turkey youth international footballers
Association football defenders
Gençlerbirliği S.K. footballers
Süper Lig players